Yasnier Toledo López (born 15 September 1989 in Camagüey) is a Cuban amateur boxer from Pinar del Río who won the bronze medal at the 2012 Summer Olympics and the PanAm lightweight title in 2011. He is a southpaw.

Career
After winning the 52 kg Under-17 world title in 2005, the following year he lost in the final to Russia's Vladimir Saruhanyan.

As a senior, he stood in the shadows of the near-invincible Guillermo Rigondeaux but when Rigondeaux didn't participate in 2007 he won the 54 kg national championships against Yankiel León and the international tournament Ahmet Comert cup.

In 2008 when Rigondeaux was suspended by the authorities, Toledo was defeated by veteran León at the Cuban national championships and therefore León was selected to be Cuba's representative in the 54 kg division.

In 2009 Toledo moved to featherweight and lost the national final to Ivan Onate.  Toledo won the Cuban nationals in his division every year from 2010 to 2015.

In 2011 he became silver medalist at the World Championships after losing to Vasyl Lomachenko, later in the year he beat Robson Conceição to win the PanAm Games.

At the 2012 Summer Olympics, he beat Liu Qiang and Gani Zhaylauov before losing his semifinal match to Lomachenko.  Through his performance Toledo won a bronze medal.

At the 2013 World Championships, he competed as a light welterweight, winning the silver medal, losing in the final to Merey Ashkalov.  He won bronze in the same division at the 2015 World Championships.  At the 2016 Olympics, he beat Pat McCormack before losing to eventual silver medalist Lorenzo Sotomayor.

References

External links
 
 
 
 World cadet results 2005
 National win 2007
 Nationals 2009

1989 births
Living people
Cuban male boxers
Olympic boxers of Cuba
Olympic bronze medalists for Cuba
Olympic medalists in boxing
Boxers at the 2012 Summer Olympics
Boxers at the 2016 Summer Olympics
Medalists at the 2012 Summer Olympics
Pan American Games gold medalists for Cuba
Pan American Games medalists in boxing
Boxers at the 2011 Pan American Games
Boxers at the 2015 Pan American Games
Central American and Caribbean Games gold medalists for Cuba
Competitors at the 2014 Central American and Caribbean Games
AIBA World Boxing Championships medalists
Lightweight boxers
Central American and Caribbean Games medalists in boxing
Medalists at the 2011 Pan American Games
Medalists at the 2015 Pan American Games
Sportspeople from Camagüey
21st-century Cuban people